Markham may refer to:

Biology
 Markham's storm-petrel (Oceanodroma markhami), a seabird species found in Chile and Colombia
 Markham's grass mouse (Abrothrix olivaceus markhami), a rodent subspecies found on Wellington Island and the nearby Southern Patagonian Ice Field in southern Chile
 Ulmus americana 'Markham', an American elm cultivar

Companies
 Markham & Co., an ironworks and steelworks company near Chesterfield, Derbyshire, England
 Markham Vineyards, vineyards located in the city of St. Helena, California, United States

People 
 Markham (surname)
 Markham Baronets, two baronetcies created for persons with the surname Markham
 Mrs Markham, the pseudonym of Elizabeth Penrose (1780-1837), an English writer
 Robert Markham, a pseudonym created by Glidrose Publications in the mid-1960s to continue the James Bond book series

Places

Antarctica 
 Markham Bay (Antarctica), James Ross Island
 Mount Albert Markham, in the Churchill Mountains
 Mount Markham, in the Queen Elizabeth Range

Canada 
 Markham By-Pass (disambiguation), multiple uses
 Markham Ice Shelf, formerly attached to Ellesmere Island, Nunavut
 Markham, Ontario, a city
 Markham Village, Ontario, the traditional downtown of the city

Papua New Guinea 
 Markham Bay (Papua New Guinea)
 Markham District, Morobe Province
 Markham Valley
 Markham River, in the valley

United Kingdom
 Markham, Caerphilly, a village in Wales
 A cluster of places in Nottinghamshire, England:
 East Markham
 West Markham
 Markham Moor

United States 
 Markham House (disambiguation), multiple locations
 Markham, Illinois, a city
 Markham, Morgan County, Illinois, an unincorporated community
 Markham, Minnesota, an unincorporated community
 Markham, Portland, Oregon, a neighborhood in the city of Portland
 Markham, Texas, a census-designated place
 Markham, Virginia (disambiguation), multiple locations
 Markham, Washington, a census-designated place (CDP) 
 Bellefontaine/Governor Markham, Pasadena, California, a neighborhood in the city of Pasadena
 Meriden Markham Municipal Airport, a public-use airport located near Meriden, Connecticut
 Markham Mound, one of three burial mounds in the village of Zaleski, Ohio, United States
 Markham Regional Arboretum, a natural arboretum located in Concord, California
 Gensburg-Markham Prairie, also known as Markham Prairie, a tallgrass prairie located in Markham in the Chicago Metropolitan Area

Other uses
 Markham (TV series), starring Ray Milland, which aired in the United States during the 1959-60 season
 Markham College, a school in Lima, Peru
Greater Markham Area gas fields, a North Sea natural gas field, partly in the United Kingdom and partly in the Netherlands

See also 
 Markham Gang, a notorious criminal organization located primarily in Ontario, Canada in the middle of the 19th century
 Markham languages, a subgroup of the Huon Gulf languages with Lower and Upper subgroups
 Marcum